The largemouth shiner (Cyprinella bocagrande) is a critically endangered species of cyprinid fish. It is found only in the Guzmán Basin in northwestern Chihuahua, Mexico, where it is called sardinita bocagrande. In 2012, it only survived in a single spring, which also was the last remaining habitat for the Carbonera pupfish (Cyprinodon fontinalis) and the dwarf crayfish Cambarellus chihuahuae. As this single spring was declining, it was decided to move some individuals of all three species to a nearby refuge in 2014 as a safeguard.

References

Cyprinella
Freshwater fish of Mexico
Endemic fish of Mexico
Taxa named by Barry Chernoff
Taxa named by Robert Rush Miller
Fish described in 1982
Taxonomy articles created by Polbot